João Filipe Pereira de Freitas (born 4 June 1992) is a Portuguese footballer who plays for GD Gafanha on loan from Leixões S.C., as a defender.

Club career
On 28 August 2016, Freitas made his professional debut with Leixões in a 2016–17 LigaPro match against Varzim.

References

External links

Stats and profile at LPFP 

1992 births
Living people
People from Sintra
Portuguese footballers
Association football defenders
Liga Portugal 2 players
Segunda Divisão players
Sertanense F.C. players
Amora F.C. players
Casa Pia A.C. players
Leixões S.C. players
Sportspeople from Lisbon District